Arthur L. "Art" Berman (May 4, 1935 – June 6, 2020) was an American lawyer and politician.

Born in Chicago, Illinois, Berman attended the Chicago public schools and Senn High School. In 1955, Berman graduated from University of Illinois Urbana-Champaign and then received his law degree in 1958 from the Northwestern University Pritzker School of Law. He practiced law in Chicago and was involved with the Democratic Party. Berman served in the Illinois House of Representatives from 1967 to 1976 and then served in the Illinois Senate from 1977 until 2000.

Notes

External links
Arthur Berman at the Edgewater Historical Society

1935 births
2020 deaths
Politicians from Chicago
University of Illinois Urbana-Champaign alumni
Northwestern University Pritzker School of Law alumni
Illinois lawyers
Democratic Party members of the Illinois House of Representatives
Democratic Party Illinois state senators